Alex "Big Ming" Menzies was a Scottish professional footballer, who played for Cowdenbeath and Stirling Albion amongst others.

A former coal-miner, (Ferguson 2006) Menzies joined Cowdenbeath, his hometown club, in 1948. Menzies, a tough-tackling wing half was a member of the side that took Rangers to the brink of defeat over a two-legged Scottish League Cup tie in September 1949. The late Harry Ewing said that "If you cut Ming in half, like a stick of Blackpool Rock he would have Cowdenbeath printed around his waist.". After his death in 1990, Ewing recommended Cowdenbeath's new stand be named "The Alex Menzies Stand", a suggestion that was adopted by the board.

Everyone in Cowdenbeath knew Big Ming. He belonged to the Desperate Dan school of Scottish footballing manhood – Ron Ferguson

Notes

Bibliography
 Ferguson, R Black Diamonds and the Blue Brazil, 1993 Aberdeen, Northern Books for Famedram 
 Ferguson, R Helicopter Dreams, 2006 Aberdeen Northern 

1990 deaths
Alloa Athletic F.C. players
Cowdenbeath F.C. players
Dumbarton F.C. players
Scottish Football League players
Scottish footballers
St Johnstone F.C. players
Stirling Albion F.C. players
Year of birth missing
People from Cowdenbeath
Scottish miners
Association football midfielders